Phallus formosanus is a species of fungus belonging to the genus Phallus. It was documented in 1938.

References  

Phallales
Fungi described in 1938